Martin Woosnam (1903–1962) was an English amateur footballer who played as a centre half in the Football League for Thames and Brentford. He captained the England amateur international team and was later capped by Wales at the same level.

Career statistics

References

People from Clun
Association football central defenders
Thames A.F.C. players
Brentford F.C. players
English Football League players
1903 births
Wales amateur international footballers
1962 deaths
Manchester City F.C. players
English footballers
England amateur international footballers